Ondřej Šašinka (born 21 March 1998) is a Czech footballer who plays as a forward for Slovácko on loan from Baník Ostrava.

His older brother Jakub is also a football player.

Career

FK Senica
Šašinka made his professional debut for Senica against Žilina on 18 February 2017.

Honours
Individual
 UEFA European Under-19 Championship Team of the Tournament: 2017

References

External links
 FK Senica official club profile
 Eurofotbal profile
  
 Futbalnet Profile

1998 births
Living people
People from Frýdek-Místek
Czech footballers
Czech expatriate footballers
Czech Republic youth international footballers
Association football forwards
FC Baník Ostrava players
Czech First League players
FK Senica players
FC ViOn Zlaté Moravce players
Slovak Super Liga players
Czech expatriate sportspeople in Slovakia
Expatriate footballers in Slovakia
Czech Republic under-21 international footballers
1. FC Slovácko players
Sportspeople from the Moravian-Silesian Region